Leftfield are a British electronic music group

Leftfield or Left Field may also refer to:
 Left field, a position in baseball
 The Left Field, an event at a number of British music festivals
 Left Field Lounge, the area beyond the stadium fence at Mississippi State University
 Leftfield Magazine, the magazine of Scottish Socialist Youth
 Left Field Productions, a video game development studio

See also
 Out of left field, American slang for "out of nowhere", "unexpectedly", "strange"